Basarabeasca is a district in the south of Moldova, with the administrative center at Basarabeasca.

History
From 1393 to 1538, the region was part of the principality of Moldavia. In the 16th, 17th and 18th centuries, the region was populated by Tatars. Localities with the oldest documentary attestation is Sadaclia, remembered the first time in 1793. In 1812, after the Russo-Turkish War (1806-1812), is the occupation of Basarabia, Russian Empire during this period (1812–1917), there is an intense russification of the native population. In 1918, after the collapse of the Russian Empire, Bessarabia united with Romania. During this period (1918–1940 and 1941–1944), the district was part of Tighina County. After the 1939 Molotov–Ribbentrop Pact, Bessarabia was occupied by the USSR in June 1940. In 1991 as a result of the proclamation of Independence of Moldova, the district became part of Lăpușna County (1991–2003), and in 2003 it became an administrative unit of Moldova.

Geography
District is located in the southern part of the Republic of Moldova. Neighborhood has the following district: north Cimislia District, the east boundary of the state with Ukraine, in the west and south bordering of Gagauzia. Also the district is the smallest area and population of Moldova was. The landscape of the field with maximum altitudes of 210–220 m with a mild erosion processes.

Climate
Temperate continental climate with an annual average district temperature +10+11 C. In July the average temperature is +23 C, and in January −3 C. The annual precipitation is 450–550 mm, and the average wind speed is 2–5 m/s.

Fauna
Typical European fauna, with the presence of mammals such as foxes, hedgehogs, deer, wild boar, polecat, wild cat, ermine, and others, and birds such as partridges, crows, eagles, starling, swallow, and more.

Flora
Forests of the district are complemented by tree species such as oak, ash, hornbeam, linden, maple, walnut and others. From plants: wormwood, knotweed, fescue, nettle and many others.

Rivers
District is located in Cogâlnic River basin (243 km) which crosses the district from northwest to southeast. Most lakes are of artificial origin.

Administrative subdivisions
Localities: 10
Administrative center: Basarabeasca
Cities: Basarabeasca
Communes: 3BogdanovcaCarabiberIvanovca
Villages: 6AbacliaBașcaliaCarabetovcaIordanovcaIserliaSadaclia

Demographics

1 January 2012 the district population was 29,000 of which 42.8% urban and 57.2% rural population

Births (2010): 241 (8.2 per 1000)
Deaths (2010): 389 (13.3 per 1000)
Growth rate (2010): -148 (−5.1 per 1000)

Ethnic groups

Footnote: * There is an ongoing controversy regarding the ethnic identification of Moldovans and Romanians.

Religion
Christians – 97.5%
Orthodox Christians – 93.7%
Protestant – 3.8%
Baptists – 1.7%
Seventh-day Adventists – 1.0%
Evangelicals – 0.6%
Pentecostals – 0.5%
Other – 1.2%
No Religion – 1.0
Atheists – 0.3%

Economy
Activities dominate the economy of the district are: trade (81%), paid services (18%), agriculture and manufacturing (1%). Of the total number of SME's which have 94.3% of all businesses in the district are recorded with only 50% profit. The local economy is based on sectors: manufacturing, trade and services, transport and communications. Small and medium business sector of the district lies Basarabeasca 99% of all enterprises in the district and 47.9% of all workers already employed.

Education
The district Basarabeasca working 11 educational institutions, including: total students: in schools – 4234 children. Four secondary schools – 749 children, seven high schools – 3485 children. Institutions, school children −1014. School sports – 233 children.

Politics
Traditional Basarabeasca district, political and electoral support PCRM unlike the south part of Moldova. But the last three elections communists is a continuous fall in percentage.

During the last three elections AEI had an increase of 131.8%

Elections

|-
!style="background-color:#E9E9E9" align=center colspan="2" valign=center|Parties and coalitions
!style="background-color:#E9E9E9" align=right|Votes
!style="background-color:#E9E9E9" align=right|%
!style="background-color:#E9E9E9" align=right|+/−
|-
| 
|align=left|Party of Communists of the Republic of Moldova
|align="right"|6,317
|align="right"|50.20
|align="right"|−1.85
|-
| 
|align=left|Liberal Democratic Party of Moldova
|align="right"|3,219
|align="right"|25.58
|align="right"|+12.33
|-
| 
|align=left|Democratic Party of Moldova
|align="right"|1,619
|align="right"|12,87
|align="right"|+2.38
|-
| 
|align=left|Party Alliance Our Moldova
|align="right"|345
|align="right"|2.74
|align="right"|−4.82
|-
| 
|align=left|Liberal Party
|align="right"|336
|align="right"|2.67
|align="right"|−2.83
|-
|bgcolor="grey"|
|align=left|Humanist Party of Moldova
|align="right"|151
|align="right"|1.20
|align="right"|+1.20
|-
|bgcolor="grey"|
|align=left|Other Party
|align="right"|602
|align="right"|4.74
|align="right"|-6.38
|-
|align=left style="background-color:#E9E9E9" colspan="2"|Total (turnout 73.55%)
|width="30" align="right" style="background-color:#E9E9E9"|12,699
|width="30" align="right" style="background-color:#E9E9E9"|100.00
|width="30" align="right" style="background-color:#E9E9E9"|

Culture
The district operates 8 cultural units, two museums, three bands, holding the title of the band model, public libraries – 14. Monastery "St. Nicholas".

Health
The district of Basarabeasca currently provides: a district hospital, a center of family doctors (which staffed by four doctors in the practice of family medicine), four general health centers, an emergency medical facility, two dental surgeries, and six pharmacies.

References

 District population per year
 District site
 Discuție:Raionul Basarabeasca
 Rezultatele alegerilor din 28 noiembrie 2010 în raionul Basarabeasca

 
Districts of Moldova
Moldova–Ukraine border